Ephraim King Wilson (September 15, 1771 – January 2, 1834) was a Congressional Representative for the State of Maryland.

Wilson was born near Snow Hill, Maryland, on September 15, 1771. Graduated from Princeton College in 1790, studied law and was admitted to the bar in 1792.  He opened a practice in Snow Hill and was elected from the eighth district of Maryland to the Twentieth Congress and reelected as a Jacksonian to the Twenty-first Congress.  He resumed his law practice in Snow Hill after a failed nomination to the Twenty-second Congress and continued his practice until his death in Snow Hill on January 2, 1834.  He is buried in the churchyard of Makemie Memorial Presbyterian Church. He was also the father of Ephraim King Wilson II and William Sydney Wilson. His daughter was the second wife of Maryland Court of Appeals judge Ara Spence.

References

1771 births
1834 deaths
People from Snow Hill, Maryland
Princeton University alumni
Maryland Democrats
National Republican Party members of the United States House of Representatives from Maryland
Jacksonian members of the United States House of Representatives from Maryland
Burials in Maryland
19th-century American politicians